Kevin Michael Joseph Barry (born 10 October 1959, in Christchurch) is a New Zealand former boxer, boxing trainer, manager and occasional commentator. He is the son of noted boxing trainer Kevin Barry Sr.

Amateur career 
Kevin Barry's first international success was a bronze medal at the 1982 Brisbane Commonwealth Games in the Light Heavyweight division.

Barry was the first boxer in 56 years to win a medal at the Olympic Games for New Zealand.

Olympic results 
Defeated Don Smith (Trinidad and Tobago) 5–0
Defeated Jonathan Kiriisa (Uganda) 3–2
Defeated Jean-Paul Nanga (Cameroon) 4–1
Defeated Evander Holyfield (United States) DQ 2
Lost to Anton Josipović (Yugoslavia)

Professional career 
Barry became a professional coach in 1990. He remains active in boxing as a trainer and manager.

Training career 
Barry remained involved in boxing and became a trainer. After New Zealand Heavyweight David Tua won bronze at the 1992 Summer Olympics in  Barcelona, Barry helped persuade him to turn professional, managing Tua from 1992–2003 and acting as his trainer from 2001–3.

Under Barry's management Tua became a contender, unsuccessfully challenging heavyweight champion Lennox Lewis in 2000. In addition Barry has a number of up and coming boxers under his guidance. He also trains prominent businessmen, Las Vegas club owners, and Wall Street businessmen.

Personal life

Barry is married to former New Zealand Olympic gymnast Tanya Moss. They have three children together (daughter Jordy, and twin sons Taylor and Mitchell). They reside in Las Vegas, Nevada.

A frequent commentator on New Zealand boxing broadcasts, and is a prominent member of the New Zealand boxing community, Barry has been active in nearly all facets of boxing – from Olympic athlete to trainer, manager, promoter and television commentator.

Notable boxers trained

 Joseph Parker
 Izu Ugonoh
 Robbie Peden
 David Tua
 Beibut Shumenov
 Brian Minto
 Shane Cameron
 Maselino Masoe

References 

Boxers at the 1984 Summer Olympics
Boxers at the 1982 Commonwealth Games
Olympic silver medalists for New Zealand
Commonwealth Games bronze medallists for New Zealand
Olympic boxers of New Zealand
1959 births
Living people
Boxers from Christchurch
Olympic medalists in boxing
New Zealand male boxers
Boxing trainers
Medalists at the 1984 Summer Olympics
Commonwealth Games medallists in boxing
New Zealand boxing trainers
Light-heavyweight boxers
Medallists at the 1982 Commonwealth Games